The Shire of Flinders was a local government area encompassing the extremity of the Mornington Peninsula, about  south of Melbourne, the state capital of Victoria, Australia.

History

The Kangerong Road District (adjoining Port Phillip) was created on 14 October 1862. The Flinders Road District, on the east of the peninsula, was created on 15 December 1868. They united to become the Shire of Flinders and Kangerong on 24 December 1874, which was renamed Flinders on 28 January 1914. On 19 October 1960, part of the Eastern Riding was transferred to the new Shire of Hastings, which had split from the Shire of Frankston.

On 15 December 1994, the Shire of Flinders was abolished, and along with the Shires of Hastings and Mornington, and parts of the City of Frankston, was merged into the newly created Shire of Mornington Peninsula. The Age reported in July 1994 that the result had been supported by Hastings and Mornington councils from the beginning, but opposed by Flinders, which wanted to merge with the southern coastal section of Hastings.

Council formerly met at the Shire Offices, on Boneo Road, Rosebud. The facility is still used today by the Shire of Mornington Peninsula.

Wards

The Shire of Flinders was divided into four ridings in May 1961, each of which elected three councillors:
 Matthew Riding
 Murray Riding
 Bowen Riding
 Collins Riding

Suburbs and localities
 Arthurs Seat
 Boneo
 Dromana
 Blairgowrie
 Cape Schanck
 Fingal
 Flinders
 Main Ridge
 McCrae
 Point Nepean
 Portsea*
 Red Hill
 Rosebud
 Rosebud South
 Rosebud West
 Rye
 Safety Beach
 Shoreham (shared with the Shire of Hastings)
 Sorrento
 St Andrews Beach
 Tootgarook

* Council seat.

Population

* Estimate in the 1958 Victorian Year Book.
+ Drop in population due to loss of part of eastern riding to the new Shire of Hastings in 1960.

References

External links
 Victorian Places - Flinders Shire

Flinders
Mornington Peninsula
1862 establishments in Australia
1994 disestablishments in Australia